Kim Kelly is an American journalist and writer, best known for her coverage of labour issues and of heavy metal music.

Early life 
Kelly grew up in a working class household with several generations having worked in the construction industry and having been active within construction industry trade unions.

Career 
Kelly began her career in journalism covering music and culture, in particular the heavy metal music scene. Beginning with writing for her school newspaper as a teenager, she eventually became editor for Vice Magazine's music and culture section. In 2015, she became one of the leaders of the successful unionisation drive at Vice Media. She was laid off from Vice in 2019, as part of mass layoffs by the company.

Following the unionisation drive, she began covering labour issues more frequently, including starting a regular column on labour for Teen Vogue in 2018.

In 2021, she was elected to the council of the Writers Guild of America, East.

In April 2022, she released Fight Like Hell: The Untold History of American Labor, a non-fiction book covering the history of the American labour movement and of marginalised voices who have been overlooked in most narratives of the American labour movement.

Activism 
Kelly was an anti-fascist counter-demonstrator at the Unite the Right rally in Charlottesville in 2017, with the Metropolitan Anarchist Coordinating Council. She has outspoken against Nazis within the metal community. She was a co-founder of the Black Flags Over Brooklyn anti-fascist music festival.

References 

American trade unionists
American music journalists
American anti-fascists
Year of birth missing (living people)
Living people